Ulrich Gabler (1 October 1913 – 24 February 1994) was a German shipbuilding engineer, who specialized in the design and development of diesel-powered submarines.

Suhren had recommended Gabler for the Knight's Cross of the Iron Cross, a request that was turned down and Gabler received the German Cross in Gold on 15 October 1942. Following his war patrols on U-564 he worked on the design and development of the U-boat classes XXII, XVII A and XXVI.

After the war he founded the Ingenieurkontor Lübeck (IKL) which among others designed the type 201, 202 and 209 submarines.

In 1963 he was appointed honorary professor at the University of Hamburg for shipbuilding.

Awards
 Iron Cross (1939) 2nd and 1st Class
 U-boat War Badge (1939)
 German Cross in Gold on 15 October 1942 as Oberleutnant (Ing.) of the Reserves on U-564/1. Unterseebootsflottille
 War Merit Cross 2nd and 1st Class

References
Citations

Bibliography

External links

1913 births
1994 deaths
Engineers from Berlin
Recipients of the Gold German Cross
Kriegsmarine personnel
Academic staff of the University of Hamburg